The Trofeo dello Scalatore was a single-day road bicycle race held annually in Marche, Italy from 1987 to 2001. The race consisted of a very hilly course designed as a competition for climbing specialists. It consisted of several competitions throughout the race which awarded points, with the race winner being the rider with the most total points.

Winners

References

Cycle races in Italy
Classic cycle races
Recurring sporting events established in 1987
1987 establishments in Italy
2001 disestablishments in Italy
Recurring sporting events disestablished in 2001
Defunct cycling races in Italy